A Triplex locomotive is a steam locomotive that divides the driving force on its wheels by using three pairs of cylinders rigidly mounted to a single locomotive frame. Inevitably any such locomotive will be articulated. All the examples that have been produced were of the Mallet type but with one extra set of driving wheels under the tender.

Triplex classes
Baldwin Locomotive Works built three Triplex locomotives for the Erie Railroad between 1914 and 1916. The first was named Matt H. Shay, after a beloved employee of that road. These Triplexes were given the classification of "P1" and they could reportedly pull 650 freight cars. The Triplexes were primarily used as pushers on grades requiring helper locomotives. Slow moving, the Triplexes were not considered highly successful, and no more were built for Erie. The Erie Railroad scrapped their Triplexes from 1929, 1931, and 1933.

Another very similar designed Triplex was built by Baldwin as a 2-8-8-8-4 for the Virginian Railway, as No. 700, in 1916. This triplex was given classification of "XA", so named due to the experimental nature of the locomotive. The XA was sent back to Baldwin Locomotive Works where it was taken apart in 1920 and converted into a 2-8-8-0 and a 2-8-2. These two engines were in service until 1953. Neither of the two engines were preserved.

Baldwin filed a patent application for a quadruplex locomotive in 1913. There was also a proposal for a quadruplex super Garratt locomotive with a 2-6-6-2+2-6-6-2 wheel arrangement for South African Railways, but this was never built.

Usage 

The center set of cylinders received high-pressure steam. The exhaust from these was fed to the two other sets of cylinders, which were valved for low pressure. The right cylinder exhausted into the front set of low pressure cylinders, and the left into the rear set; this is also why the high pressure cylinders have the same diameter as the low pressure ones, making the engine a 2 to 1 compound, whereas most mallet locomotives have much smaller high pressure cylinders. The front set exhausted through the smokebox and the rear set exhausted first through a feedwater heater in the tender and then to the open air through a large pipe, which can be seen in the photo. Since only half of the exhaust steam exited through the smokebox, firebox draft (and thus boiler heating) was poor. Although the boiler was large (in line with contemporary two-cylinder and four-cylinder practice), six large cylinders demanded more steam than even such a boiler could supply.

The Erie locomotives always operated compound and did not have starting valves which would have put full pressure on all six cylinders, even so the Triplexes produced huge amounts of tractive effort (TE) that may have been the highest of any steam locomotives before or since. The Triplexes could also be considered the largest tank engines ever built since the tender had driving wheels as well and thus contributed to traction. The problem of variable adhesion on the tender unit was not a serious one, since pusher locomotives had frequent opportunities to take on additional fuel and water. In total, only four Triplexes came into existence and only in the United States; all of the Erie triplexes were retired by 1930; none were preserved. The Virginian XA #700 2-8-8-8-4 was unsuccessful. It was returned to Baldwin where it was rebuilt into a 2-8-2, numbered 410, and a 2-8-8-0, numbered 610. A two wheel trailing truck was added later, making it into a 2-8-8-2. These two locomotives were operated until 1953.

Expanding the concept

Quadruplex 
In June 1914, George R. Henderson was granted US Patent 1,100,563 for a quadruplex 2-8-8-8-8-2 locomotive, which was assigned to the Baldwin Locomotive Company.  Baldwin submitted the design to the Atchison, Topeka, and Santa Fe Railway, which in the 1910s was a strong proponent of compound locomotives.

This would have been, in 1913, by far the largest steam locomotive ever proposed.

The Quadruplex was to comprise three articulated engines of 8 driving wheels each beneath the locomotive itself, and a fourth engine beneath the tender. As a compound locomotive, engine cylinders 7 and 9 (as numbered on the above image) would receive high pressure steam to drive the first and third engines, each would exhaust as low-pressure steam to power cylinders 8 and 10 on the second and fourth engines. Both sets of low-pressure cylinders would then exhaust direct to atmosphere through stacks 33 and 38.
Due mostly to its extreme length the design included a number of mostly untried innovations:
An engineer’s cab (24) at the very front, as well as a fireman’s cab (23) behind the firebox (17). Communication between the cabs was proposed as cable- or rod-operated signalling devices, similar to the engine order telegraph used on steamships, and possibly a voice pipe 
A jointed boiler with a flexible coupling (16) allowing the boiler casing to flex laterally on track curves.
 Two separate boilers, served by the single firebox: The front boiler (21) to supply the front two engines, the rear boiler (20) to supply the rear two engines. 
A turbine-driven extractor fan (26) within the smokebox (25) was intended to maintain a constant draft through the flues of both boilers. This was because Henderson had calculated that a conventional blast pipe utilizing steam exhausted from the low-pressure cylinders would have been inadequate to provide a sufficient draft until the locomotive was in motion.

By the time the patent was granted, the experience of the existing triplexes and jointed boiler locomotives had shown the shortcomings of these designs, and the quadruplex did not proceed to construction.

Quintuplex 

A quintuplex version (2-8-8-8-8-8-2) was included in the patent application. The design was based on the quadruplex, with the fourth and fifth engines under an extended, articulated tender.

An even larger 2-10-10-10-10-10-2 variant appeared as an artist’s impression in the August 1951 issue of Trains magazine. However, this idea appears to be speculative on the part of the magazine author and the artist, perhaps because AT&SF already had a fleet of 2-10-10-2’s in 1913. There is no evidence that George Henderson, nor Baldwin, proposed such a version.

References

Bibliography 

 .

External links
Web Site of ToyTrains1 2-8-8-8-2 Triplex Steam Locomotives

Steam locomotive types

cs:Lokomotiva Triplex